Borsh is a village in Albania. Borsh  may also refer to:
 Borscht, a Ukrainian soup

See also
Borș (disambiguation)
Borsch (disambiguation)